Daniel Liszka (born 17 February 2000) is a Polish professional footballer who plays for Górnik Zabrze II.

Club career
On 12 August 2020, he signed a one-year contract with Wigry Suwałki.

References

External links

2000 births
Living people
Polish footballers
Poland youth international footballers
Association football defenders
Górnik Zabrze players
GKS Jastrzębie players
Wigry Suwałki players
Ekstraklasa players
I liga players
II liga players
III liga players